The Greek Orthodox Metropolis of Detroit is one of the Metropolises of the Greek Orthodox Archdiocese of America with 46 parishes.

References

Dioceses of the Greek Orthodox Archdiocese of America